Asociación Deportiva Somos Aduanas  is a Peruvian football club, playing in the city of Bellavista, Callao, Lima.

History
The Asociación Deportiva Somos Aduanas was founded in 1996.

In the 2001 Copa Perú, Somos Aduanas classified to the National Stage, but was eliminated by C.D. Universidad Nacional de Ucayali.

The club played in the Segunda Division Peruana from 2002 until 2005, when was relegated to the Copa Perú.

Honours

Regional
Región IV:
Winners (1): 2001
 Runner-up (1): 1999

Liga Departamental de Callao:
Winners (3): 1998, 1999, 2001

Liga Superior del Callao:
 Runner-up (1): 2015

Liga Distrital de La Perla:
Winners (3): 1996, 1997, 2001
 Runner-up (1): 2010

See also
List of football clubs in Peru
Peruvian football league system

External links
 Blog Asociacion Deportiva Somos Aduanas
 RSSSF - Peru - List of Departamental Champions

Football clubs in Peru
Association football clubs established in 1996
1996 establishments in Peru